The women's 400 metres event at the 1994 European Athletics Championships was held in Helsinki, Finland, at Helsinki Olympic Stadium on 8, 9, and 11 August 1994.

Medalists

Results

Final
11 August

Semi-finals
9 August

Semi-final 1

Semi-final 2

Heats
8 August

Heat 1

Heat 2

Heat 3

Participation
According to an unofficial count, 24 athletes from 14 countries participated in the event.

 (2)
 (1)
 (1)
 (2)
 (1)
 (3)
 (2)
 (2)
 (1)
 (1)
 (3)
 (1)
 (1)
 (3)

References

400 metres
400 metres at the European Athletics Championships
1994 in women's athletics